Doctor's Diary is a German-Austrian medical drama that aired for three seasons from 2008 to 2011 on RTL in a coproduction with ORF. The focus of the series is the young doctor Margarete "Gretchen" Haase, who wants to make a career in a hospital. It was directed by Bora Dağtekin and shown from 23 June 2008 to 14 February 2011 on German channel RTL.

In Canada, it was shown starting 31 August 2010 on Séries+ television. In France from 8 June 2011 on TF1 television and starting 31 March 2013 on HD1 television.

Plot

One week before her wedding to her fiancé Peter, Gretchen Haase's world falls apart. She returns to Berlin to her parents' house where her father, Professor Franz Haase, makes a suggestion that she applies for an assistant doctor position in surgery at the hospital where he works. Following up on his suggestion, she meets her old school crush Dr. Marc Meier, who works as the head of surgery at the hospital. During their schooldays, he never wasted a day in making her life difficult and never returned her affection. Now as they meet again, he promptly starts to tease her again, this time about her weight, which she is very sensitive about.

Cast 
Diana Amft (VF: Micheline Tsiamalis): Dr. Margarete "Gretchen (en VO) / Meg (en VF)" Haase
Florian David Fitz (VF: Alexandre Crepet): Dr. Marc Olivier Meier
Kai Schumann (VF: Sébastien Hébrant): Dr. Mehdi Kaan
Peter Prager (VF: Jean-Michel Vovk): Dr. Franz Haase
Laura Osswald (VF: Chloé Berthier): Gabi Kragenow
Ursela Monn (VF: Francine Laffineuse): Bärbel Haase
Annette Strasser: Sabine Vögler
Julia Koschitz: Dr Maria Hassmann
Zsá Zsá Inci Bürkle: Margarete "Gretchen (en VO) / Meg (en VF)" Haase young
Antoine Brison & Lucas Reiber: Marc Olivier Meier young
Fabian Oscar Wien (VF: Christophe Hespel): Jochen Haase (seasons 1–2)
Chantal Hourticolon: Lilly Kaan (seasons 1–2)
Adele Neuhauser: Elke Fisher
Bo Hansen: Gordon Tolkien
Hannah Schröder: Anna Kaan (seasons 1–2)
Dominic Boeer: Brad Hollister (seasons 1 & 3)
Elyas M'Barek: Dr. Maurice Knechtelsdorfer  (seasons 2–3)
Steffen Groth: Frank Muffke / Alexis von Buren (seasons 2–3)
Paula Schramm: Lissi von Buren (seasons 2–3)
Roberto Guerra: Eric (season 2)
Bärbel Schleker: Madame Nettelsbacher (season 2)
Nina Vorbrodt: Stefanie Brinkmann (season 3)
Cristina do Rego: Sœur Ingeborg (seasons 2–3)
Valerie Niehaus: Dr Gina "Gigi" Amsel (seasons 2–3)
Ingrid van Bergen: Mechthild von Buren (seasons 2–3)
Marc Benjamin Puch: Dr Günni Gümmersbach (season 3)
Maria Ehrich: Peggy (season 3)
Irm Hermann: Madame Vögler (saison 3)
Christian Näthe: Fritz (season 3)
Nora Tschirner: Mitzi Knechtelsdorfer (season 3)
Maxi Biewer: Maxi Biewer (season 3)
Angela Finger-Erben: Angela Finger-Erben (season 3)
Günther Jauch: Günther Jauch (season 3)

See also
List of German television series

References

External links

German comedy-drama television series
2008 German television series debuts
2011 German television series endings
German-language television shows
RTL (German TV channel) original programming
ORF (broadcaster) original programming